Leonard Abel or Léonardo Abela (died 2 May 1605) was a Roman Catholic prelate who served as Titular Bishop of Sidon (1582–1605). An outstanding linguist, conversant in Hebrew, Chaldean, Syriac and Arabic, Pope Gregory XIII named him titular bishop of Sidon, and appointed him legate to the Eastern Churches. Born in Malta, he died in Rome in 1605.

Biography
Leonardo Abela was born to a noble and wealthy family in Malta. In 1562/64, he had a summer residence built in the village of Tarxien, the Palazzo Abela. From May to September 1565, During the Great Siege of Malta by the Ottomans, the attackers occupied part of the island (including the Palazzo Abela). The Order of the Knights of St. John repelled the invaders.

In 1563, at the age of twenty-two, the young Leonardo became canon of St Paul's Cathedral in Mdina. By 1574, he had completed his law studies and was awarded a doctor in utroque jure. When the Bishop of Malta, Martín Rojas de Portalrubio, died in March 1577, Canon Abela was in charge of the administration of the diocese in the interim until the appointment of the new bishop, Tomás Gargal, on 11 August 1578. In 20 June 1578, Pope Gregory XIII appointed Abela Vicar General of the Diocese.

An outstanding linguist, Abela had learned four Semitic languages: Hebrew, Chaldean, Syriac and Arabic. Towards the end of 1578, he went to Rome where he quickly attracted the favour of CardinalGiulio Antonio Santorio, protector of the Eastern Churches. Abela served as a translator of the texts between Syriac and Latin.

The idea of an embassy of the Holy See in the East, to renew contact with the separate churches, took shape. On July 20, 1582, Pope Gregory appointed Abela titular bishop of Sidonia, in Asia Minor. On August 19 he received the episcopal consecration from Cardinal Santorio, Cardinal-Priest of San Bartolomeo all'Isola, with Giovanni Battista Santorio, Bishop of Alife, Antonio Poli de Mathaeis, Bishop of Bosnia, and Vincenzo Cutelli, Bishop of Catania, serving as co-consecrators.

On March 12, 1583, Bishop Abela left Rome for Syria by way of Venice, with two Jesuits as his embassy companions. They arrived in Aleppo on July 16. The Bishop met with the Syriac Orthodox patriarch at the monastery of Mar Abihaï, near Gargar on the Euphrates (ten days' journey from Aleppo); the legates left Aleppo in November, and a nephew of the patriarch came to meet them in Desse. But it was Thomas (brother of the two successive patriarchs Nemet Allah and David) who showed up, invested, he said, with full powers, because the tension was high around these talks. In three days of discussions in the monastery, then in the nearby village of Orbis, it was agreed that there was agreement on the substance, but the Jacobite bishop declared that it was quite impossible for them to recognize the Council of Chalcedon and especially the damnation of Pope Dioscorus I of Alexandria, one of the most important saints in their Church. Nor could they adopt the Gregorian calendar, which would have been interpreted in the region as a pure and simple rallying to the Catholic Church.

Leaving there after this inconclusive negotiation, the legates then moved to Sis, Cilicia, to meet the Armenian Catholicos Katchatour II, who was soon replaced by Azaria I, who dealt actively with the legation (including a little later in Aleppo), but was thwarted by a bishop who was hostile to him, and then had to go to Constantinople to justify himself. The Western ambassadors also went to meet with the two Melkite patriarchs: the one from Antioch, who resided in Damascus, and the one from Jerusalem.

The legates then returned to the port of Tripoli, where the two Jesuits were instructed to return to Rome. Leonardo Abel remained in Syria and sought to renew contact with the brothers Thomas and David who led the Jacobite Church, but he could only obtain an abundant exchange of correspondence, dilatory content. He left Syria on August 1, 1586, to return to Rome where he arrived in February 1587, and wrote his report for Pope Sixtus V (addressed on April 19, 1587). He had brought back about one hundred and fifty oriental manuscripts that joined the collections of the Vatican Library.

Close to Cardinal Santorio, Leonardo Abela remained closely involved in the Holy See's talks with the Eastern Churches. In 1588, Cardinal Girolamo Rusticucci was appointed Vicar General of the Diocese of Rome, and the Maltese Prelate became under him Vice-Manager of that diocese. In 1593, he joined a commission charged with examining a multilingual Bible project, with all the major languages of the Christian East. Arbela served as Titular Bishop of Sidon until his death on 2 May 1605.

Episcopal succession

References

External links and additional sources
 (for Chronology of Bishops) 
 (for Chronology of Bishops) 

17th-century Roman Catholic titular bishops
16th-century Roman Catholic titular bishops
Bishops appointed by Pope Gregory XIII
1605 deaths
Maltese Roman Catholic bishops